Clarkia lassenensis is a species of wildflower known by the common name Lassen clarkia. This plant is native to the US states of California, Oregon, and Nevada, where it grows in the mountains and forested plateau. The plant erects a spindly stem and bears sparse narrow leaves. The bowl-shaped flower has four lavender petals with reddish bases, each about one centimeter long. Clarkia lassenensis is pollinated by both native bees and butterflies and is usually in bloom in the late spring early summer months of May and June. The flower is a resident of Mount Lassen, from which it gets its name.

External links
Jepson Manual Profile
Photo gallery
California Native Plant Link Exchange
Blooming mon

lassenensis
Flora of California
Plants described in 1940
Flora without expected TNC conservation status